Tyko Konstantin Sallinen (March 14, 1879 in Nurmes – September 18, 1955 in Helsinki) was a Finnish expressionism style painter.

In late 1916 Sallinen became a founder member of the November Group, which was a Finnish group of expressionists and cubists.

Life
Tyko's parents were tailor Antti Sallinen and Johanna Sallinen. He spent his childhood in Haparanda. The family was strictly committed to Laestadianism. Sallinen ran away from home in age of 14, and supported himself as taylor journeyman.

Sallinen was married twice. His first wife Helmi Vartiainen ("Mirri") was the model of many of Sallinen's early paintings in style of fauvism. They were married 1909-1916 and got two daughters, Eva and Taju. Taju lived with her father after her parents' divorce. As an adult she became an author and wrote about her father. Sallinen married Katarina Tschepurnoff in 1924, and they got a daughter, Tirsi, in 1928.

Style 
Sallinen was one of the first Finnish Modernists to emphasise the power of emotion and the importance of individuality. He became the most visible member of the younger generation who depicted the Finnish landscape and people with unprecedented candour.

Works

 The Nude (Alaston, 1910)
 Nude (Alaston, 1911)
 Mirri in Black (Mirri mustassa puvussa, 1911)
 The Washerwomen (Pyykkärit, 1911)
 Early Spring (Kevättalvi, 1914)
 Self-Portrait (Omakuva, 1914)
 The "Ducat" Girl (Tukaattityttö, 1914)
 Ruokokoski Painting (Ruokokoski maalaa, 1916)
 The Tradesman's Daughters (Kauppiaan tyttäret, 1917)
 Kilpajuoksu, 1917
 Puunhakkaaja, 1917
 Rouva Kallion muotokuva, 1917
 Vådö, 1917
 The Fanatics''' or The Religious Fanatics (Hihhulit, 1918)
 The Barn Dance (Jytkyt, 1918)
 Study for The Fight III (Tutkielma Tappeluun III, 1920)

References

Further readingFacta 2001, vol. 14, p. 332–333.
Salla, Irja: Isä ja minä: Muistelmia Tyko Sallisesta.'' WSOY 1958.

External links
 Works by Sallinen. Finnish National Gallery.

1879 births
1955 deaths
People from Nurmes
20th-century Finnish painters